Bashar Mustafa Bani Yaseen (born 1 June 1977) is a retired Jordanian footballer who played as a defender.

International career
Bashar began his career as a left back, but later played as a central defender. 
  
Bashar's last match with the Jordan national team was against Iraq in Amman on 3 June 2012, in the 2014 WC qualifiers which ended in a 1-1 draw.

International goals

Honors and Participation in International Tournaments

In AFC Asian Cups 
2004 Asian Cup
2011 Asian Cup

In Pan Arab Games 
1999 Pan Arab Games

In Arab Nations Cup 
2002 Arab Nations Cup

In WAFF Championships 
2000 WAFF Championship
2002 WAFF Championship
2004 WAFF Championship
2007 WAFF Championship
2008 WAFF Championship

See also
 List of men's footballers with 100 or more international caps

References

Citations
 Al-Hazm (KSA) Signs Up Al-Jazeera (Amman) Defender Bashar Bani Yaseen
 The Captain's First International Goal
 Al-Wahdat SC Signs Up International Player Bashar Bani Yaseen
 
 Bashar Bani Yaseen Officially Signs Up for Al-Arabi (Irbid) 
 The Jordanian Defender Bashar Bani Yaseen Officially Signs Up for Sur Club of Oman

External links 
 
 
 
 
 

Living people
people from Irbid
Jordanian footballers
Jordan international footballers
Association football defenders
1977 births
Jordanian Pro League players
Al-Hussein SC (Irbid) players
Al-Jazeera (Jordan) players
Al-Wehdat SC players
Al-Arabi (Jordan) players
Oman Professional League players
Sur SC players
Saudi Professional League players
Al-Hazem F.C. players
Bahraini Premier League players
Al-Muharraq SC players
Jordanian expatriate footballers
Jordanian expatriate sportspeople in Bahrain
Jordanian expatriate sportspeople in Saudi Arabia
Jordanian expatriate sportspeople in Oman
Expatriate footballers in Bahrain
Expatriate footballers in Oman
Expatriate footballers in Saudi Arabia
2004 AFC Asian Cup players
2011 AFC Asian Cup players
FIFA Century Club